Rodel is a Filipino given name and a French surname. The German equivalent of this name is Rödel. It may refer to:

Given names
Rodel Batocabe (1966–2018), Filipino lawyer and politician
Rodel de Leon (born 1992), Filipino basketball player
Rodel Mayol (born 1981), Filipino boxer
Rodel Nacianceno (born 1981), Filipino actor
Rodel Naval (1953–1995), Filipino actor
Rodel Richards (born 2000), English footballer
Rodel Tapaya (born 1980), Filipino painter

Surnames
Gustav Rödel (1915–1995), German fighter pilot
Jürgen Rödel (born 1958), German materials scientist and professor
Manuela Rödel (born 1971), German sprinter
Raymond Rodel (1895–1967), French tennis player

Filipino masculine given names
French-language surnames
German-language surnames